George Sydney Collard (29 February 1916 – 18 June 1983) was an Australian rules footballer who played with Carlton and South Melbourne in the Victorian Football League (VFL).

Notes

External links 

George Collard's profile at Blueseum

1916 births
1983 deaths
Carlton Football Club players
Sydney Swans players
Sandhurst Football Club players
Australian rules footballers from Bendigo
Australian Army personnel of World War II
Australian Army soldiers